Georgina de Albuquerque (February 4, 1885 – August 29, 1962) was a Brazilian Impressionist painter and teacher. She was known for her interest in female subjects. Her husband Lucílio was a noted painter in his own right and the two are strongly associated with each other.

Early life 
De Albuquerque was born Georgina de Moura Andrade on February 4, 1885, in Taubaté, São Paulo. She began her studies in painting at the age of 15 in 1900 in her native Taubaté. She was tutored in her own home by the Italian painter Rosalbino Santoro, who taught her the basic principles of painting, such as the laws of perspective and the techniques of mixing paint.

Training
De Albuquerque moved to Rio de Janeiro in 1904 at the age of 19, where she enrolled at the Escola Nacional de Belas Artes (National School of Fine Arts), studying under Henrique Bernardelli. She moved to Paris in 1906, after marrying the painter Lucílio de Albuquerque. In Paris she attended the École Nationale Supérieure des Beaux-Arts and the Académie Julian, where she was a student of Henri Royer.

Career 
In 1911 Georgina de Albuquerque returned to Brazil and exhibited her work in São Paulo. From then on she participated regularly in the General Exhibition of Fine Arts.

In 1927 Georgina de Albuquerque became a professor at the Escola Nacional de Belas Artes in Rio de Janeiro, where she taught artistic design. In 1935 she began teaching a course in decorative arts at the Institute of Arts of the University of the Federal District. In 1940 she founded the Museu Lucílio de Albuquerque at her home in the neighbourhood of Laranjeiras. She established a pioneering course in drawing and painting for children. Between 1952 and 1954 she held the post of Director at the Escola Nacional de Belas Artes.

Death 
Georgina de Albuquerque died on August 29, 1962, in Rio de Janeiro at the age of 77.

Gallery

References

External links

1885 births
1962 deaths
20th-century Brazilian artists
20th-century Brazilian women artists
People from Taubaté
Brazilian painters
Brazilian Impressionist painters
Brazilian women painters
Académie Julian alumni
Brazilian expatriates in France